Kim Kyung-rae (Korean: 김경래; born March 18, 1964) is a South Korean former footballer who played as a forward.

He started professional career at Daewoo Royals in 1988.

He was winner of K League Best XI in 1994 K League.

References

External links 
 

1964 births
Living people
Association football forwards
Busan IPark players
Chonbuk Buffalo players
Jeonbuk Hyundai Motors players
South Korean footballers
Myongji University alumni